Hamu Kayondo (born 9 March 1990) is a Ugandan cricketer. He made his List A cricket debut in the 2015 ICC World Cricket League Division Two tournament for Uganda against Canada on 24 January 2015.

In April 2018, he was named in Uganda's squad for the 2018 ICC World Cricket League Division Four tournament in Malaysia. He was the leading run-scorer for Uganda in the tournament, with 179 runs in six matches.

In July 2018, he was part of Uganda's squad in the Eastern sub region group for the 2018–19 ICC World Twenty20 Africa Qualifier tournament. In September 2018, he was named in Uganda's squad for the 2018 Africa T20 Cup. The following month, he was named in Uganda's squad for the 2018 ICC World Cricket League Division Three tournament in Oman.

In May 2019, he was named in Uganda's squad for the Regional Finals of the 2018–19 ICC T20 World Cup Africa Qualifier tournament in Uganda. He made his Twenty20 International (T20I) debut for Uganda against Botswana on 20 May 2019. In July 2019, he was one of twenty-five players named in the Ugandan training squad, ahead of the Cricket World Cup Challenge League fixtures in Hong Kong.

References

External links
 

1990 births
Living people
Ugandan cricketers
Uganda Twenty20 International cricketers
Cricketers from Kampala